Bhoot Unkle is a 2006 Indian Hindi-language supernatural comedy film which released on 6 October 2006. The film was directed by Mukesh Saigal, starring Jackie Shroff and Dev K. Kantawall.

Cast
 Jackie Shroff as Bhoot Unkle
 Dev K. Kantawall as Shyam
 Akhilendra Mishra as Makhan Lal Akela (MLA)
 Sheela David as Mrs. Akela, MLA's wife
 Anurag Prapanna as Mama
 Rasika Joshi as Mami
 Dinesh Kaushik as Principal
 Shallu Singh as Principal's wife
 Shehzad Khan as Robert
 Massheuddin Qureshi as MLA's man
 K. K. Goswami as Tingu
 Sheena Bajaj as Geeta
 Jai Kanani as Satish Kumar Akela aka S. K.
 Mandar Degvekar as Shunty
 Rajesh Vivek as Tangewaala (Friendly Appearance)

Music
Mil Gaya Saathi Koi Apna, Bhoot Unkle - Baba Sehgal
Mil Gaya Saathi Koi Apna, Bhoot Unkle  (Remix) - Baba Sehgal
Happy Birthday To You - Tarannum Mallik
Hawa Hawa Nee Ho Maa - Baba Sehgal
Oh My Mom Ya Toh - Baba Sehgal
Udd Ke Jaana Hai - Tarannum Mallik

References

External links
 
 

2000s Hindi-language films
2006 films
Films scored by Baba Sehgal
Indian comedy horror films
Indian ghost films
2000s children's comedy films
2000s fantasy comedy films
Indian children's films
2006 comedy horror films
Indian films with live action and animation
2006 comedy films